Psychotria franchetiana is a species of plant in the family Rubiaceae. It is endemic to French Polynesia.

References

Flora of French Polynesia
franchetiana
Data deficient plants
Taxonomy articles created by Polbot